{{Infobox book
| name          = Mayday
| title_orig    =
| translator    =
| image         = Mayday,_Novel_Cover.jpg
| caption = First edition
| author        = Thomas Block with Nelson DeMille
| illustrator   =
| cover_artist  =
| country       =
| language      =
| series        =
| subject       =
| genre         =
| publisher     = Richard Marek Publishers
| pub_date      = November 1979
| english_pub_date =
| media_type    =
| pages         = 346
| isbn          = 0-446-60476-3
| oclc= 38146516
| preceded_by   = By the Rivers of Babylon
| followed_by   = Cathedral (DeMille)
Orbit (Block)
}}Mayday is a 1979 thriller novel by American author Thomas Block.  The novel was updated in 1998 by authors Thomas Block and Nelson DeMille and re-released as a paperback.

Plot summary
A supersonic passenger jet flying over the Pacific Ocean is struck by an errant missile. Due to the effects of decompression and oxygen deprivation, all but a handful are incapacitated.  Three survivors must attempt to land the airplane, despite attempts to cover up the disaster.

Film adaptationMayday was adapted in a television film that premiered on CBS-TV as a Sunday night movie on October 2, 2005.  The movie stars Aidan Quinn, Gail O'Grady, Dean Cain, Charles Dutton, Michael Murphy, and Kelly Hu.

The name of the airline in the original novel was Trans-United (a possible merger between TWA and United), but changed in the movie to Pacific Global (a fictional airline from another thriller novel, Shadow 81'' by Lucien Nahum). Other differences included navy pilot Peter Matos refusing to destroy the stricken airliner and diverting to an aircraft carrier (he was originally tricked into ditching his plane at sea), Harold Stein staying on board the flight (in the novel, he committed suicide by jumping from the airliner with his wife) and insurer Wayne Metz replaced by Anne Metz.

References

External links
 Mayday on Nelson DeMille's Official Website
 Mayday on Thomas Block's Official Website

1979 American novels
Novels by Nelson DeMille
Novels by Thomas Block
Aviation novels
American novels adapted into films
American novels adapted into television shows